Independence Lake is a lake located west of Carter Station, New York. The outlet creek flows into Independence River. Fish species present in the lake are brown bullhead, brook trout, and white sucker. There is trail access off Webb-Inlet Trail.

References

Lakes of New York (state)
Lakes of Herkimer County, New York